The Assassination of the Duke of Guise is an oil on canvas painting by French artist Paul Delaroche, created in 1834. It is held in the Musée Condé in Chantilly, whilst a replica hangs in the Château de Blois. Another replica was made for the 2014 exhibition L'invention du passé. Histoires de cœur et d'épée en Europe, 1802-1850. at the Musée des beaux-arts de Lyon. 

The original was commissioned in 1833 by Ferdinand-Philippe d'Orléans and delivered in May 1834. It shows Henry I, Duke of Guise's assassination by Henry III's royal guard on 23 December 1588.

References

Paintings in the collection of the Musée Condé
History paintings
Paintings of people
1834 paintings
Paintings by Paul Delaroche
Cultural depictions of Henry I, Duke of Guise